The 2017 season is Sogndal's second season back in the Tippeligaen since their relegation at the end of the 2014 season.

Squad

Out on loan

Transfers

Winter

In:

Out:

Summer

In:

Out:

Competitions

Eliteserien

Results summary

Results by round

Results

Table

Relegation play-offs

Norwegian Cup

Squad statistics

Appearances and goals

|-
|colspan="14"|Players away from Sogndal on loan:

|-
|colspan="14"|Players who left Sogndal during the season:

|}

Goal scorers

Disciplinary record

References

Sogndal Fotball seasons
Sogndal